The District Council of Birkenhead was a local government area in South Australia centred on the suburb of Birkenhead. It was gazetted on 22 February 1877 from areas formerly part of the District Council of Lefevre's Peninsula. The council chambers were based out of the Birkenhead Hotel. It absorbed the remainder of the Lefevre's Peninsula council, which had been severely reduced in size by the creation of the Corporate Town of Semaphore, on 7 August 1884. It ceased to exist when it merged with the Corporate Town of Port Adelaide on 7 December 1886 as the Birkenhead Ward, a move supported by the council and the local population.

Chairmen
 G. Playfair (1877–1878) 
 T. Cruickshank (1879–1883) 
 J. K. Charleston (1884–1886)

References

Birkenhead, District Council of
1877 establishments in Australia
1886 disestablishments in Australia
Lefevre Peninsula